Wellington City Libraries is the public library service for Wellington, New Zealand.

History 
From 1840 onwards various organisations attempted to establish a public library in Wellington. The first Council-operated public library opened in 1893 on the corner of Mercer and Wakefield Streets in a building designed by William Crichton, a prominent architect of the time. The library closed in 1940 and the building was demolished in 1943. The site was later occupied by the City Council municipal buildings that are still in use today. In 1940 a new library opened on a block between Mercer and Harris street.

Wellington Central Library

By the early 1960s, the existing library built in 1940 had become too small: some books were stored offsite because of lack of space, the newspaper reading room and some staff sections were housed elsewhere and there was a lack of space for casual seating and study. 

In 1989, Athfield Architects were commissioned to design a new Wellington Central Library. Their design won the Environmental Award in the 1992 Carter Holt Harvey Awards and the New Zealand Institute of Architects National Award (1993). The library was built by Fletcher Development and Construction. The new Wellington Central Library was opened in 1991, and the previous library building then became the City Gallery. Both buildings are located in Civic Square, with the library having its main entrance on Victoria Street and another entrance from the mezzanine level onto Civic Square. 

In March 2019, the Wellington City Council announced that the Central Library was to be closed to the public, after receiving advice from engineers that the building has structural vulnerabilities which mean it might not perform well in the event of a significant earthquake. A month later the Council announced that it would spend $179 million to repair and upgrade the library rather than demolish it.

Following the closure of the Central Library, three pop-up replacement libraries have opened in central Wellington: Arapaki Manners Library (opened in May 2019 in Manners Street), He Matapihi Molesworth Library (opened in October 2019 inside the National Library in Molesworth Street), and Te Awe Library in Brandon Street (opened in July 2020). However none of these has the reading rooms or the opening hours of the Central Library. Wellington Central Library's collection of 400,000 items has been relocated to a new collection and distribution centre named Te Pātaka,  in Johnsonville.

Branches

Wellington's first branch library opened in Newtown in 1902, stocking general literature and a range of newspapers and magazines. As of February 2023, Wellington City Libraries has 14 branches open to the public. Three of these are in central Wellington, replacing the closed Central Library, and the rest are located in suburban areas. Branches have also been given Māori names, usually based on a geographic feature or local legend. 

 Arapaki Manners Library, Te Aro
 Brooklyn Library (Te Whare Pukapuka o Moe-rā)
 Cummings Park (Ngaio) Library (Te Whare Pukapuka o Korimako, Ngaio)
 He Matapihi Molesworth Library, Thorndon
 Island Bay Library (Te Whare Pukapuka o Tapu Te Ranga)
 Johnsonville Library (Te Whare Pukapuka o Waitohi)
 Karori Library (Te Whare Pukapuka o Te Māhanga)
 Khandallah Library (Te Whare Pukapuka o Tari-Kākā)
 Mervyn Kemp (Tawa) Library (Te Whare Pukapuka o Te Takapū o Patukawenga). Mervyn Kemp was mayor of Tawa from 1955 until his retirement in 1983. The library was named in his honour in 1974.
 Miramar Library (Te Whare Pukapuka o Motu-kairangi)
 Newtown Library (Te Whare Pukapuka o Omārōrō). 
 Ruth Gotlieb (Kilbirnie) Library (Te Whare Pukapuka o Te Awa-a-Taia). The library was renamed after Wellington City Councillor Ruth Gotlieb in 2000 in recognition of her contribution to library services, including support for a mobile library and delivering library books to housebound people.
Te Awe Library, Wellington Central 
 Wadestown Library (Te Whare Pukapuka o Ōtari)

Library services 
Membership of Wellington City Libraries is free to residents and to those who work, study or pay rates in Wellington. The library has offered a variety of services over the years to keep up with changes in technology, public taste and budget. Public-access computers were introduced in 1998 for patrons to access the catalogue digitally, and in 2001 the library spent $2.35 million upgrading the system to one that was Windows-based, internet-enabled and easier for patrons to use. As of 2023 Wellington City Libraries offers online remote access to databases, e-books and audiobooks, newspapers, magazines, films, music and language learning apps. Events within the branch libraries include story times for young children, conversation groups for migrants, movie nights, and talks by authors.

From 1947 to 2006 the library operated a mobile service, taking books to communities that had no branch library or limited public transport, but this service was cancelled in 2006 due to low use and high costs. The library still has a housebound service, whereby volunteers will deliver books to those who are unable to get to a library. 

Other examples of services no longer offered include the print collection and bestseller collection.

The central library formerly held a collection of art prints which patrons could borrow. During the 1980s the library issued 7500-8000 prints annually, but by 1997 the number had halved and the print collection of 1200 items was sold. 

In 1996 the library introduced 'bestsellers': patrons could pay a small fee to jump the reserve queue for a bestselling book and borrow it immediately. This service ended in October 2022. 

On 1 July 2022 the library stopped charging overdue fees for books not returned on time, in line with a world-wide trend in public libraries. The library manager stated that overdue fines "disproportionately affect those who cannot afford to pay" and that some poorer families were too afraid to borrow items in case they became overdue. It was hoped that removing fines would encourage more people to use the library. During the period from 2019 to March 2022, Wellington City Council received more than $800,000 from fines for overdue books, and when the new policy was put into place the council wiped over $500,000 of current fines from patrons' accounts.

Awards
In 2006 the New Zealand Music Board honoured the Library with an excellence award for its "Sing along with Stu" story-time programme.

Te Awe Library in Brandon Street won the 2021 New Zealand Institute of Architects Wellington Architecture Award for public architecture for its design and décor.

References

External links

 Wellington Central Libraries website
History of Wellington City Libraries

Buildings and structures in Wellington City
Education in the Wellington Region
Libraries in Wellington